Villawood railway station is located on the Main South line, serving the Sydney suburb of Villawood. It is served by Sydney Trains T3 Bankstown line services.

History
Villawood station opened on 8 October 1924 when the Main South line was extended from Regents Park to Cabramatta.

To the south of the station lies the Southern Sydney Freight Line that opened in January 2013.

Platforms & services
Historically, Villawood was served by services from the city and Lidcombe operating to Liverpool. This changed in the early 2000s, when most services to Liverpool were altered to operate via Bankstown. Today Villawood is served by T3 Bankstown line services terminating at Liverpool.

Transport links
Transdev NSW operates three routes via Villawood station:
905: Fairfield station to Bankstown station
907: Parramatta station to Bankstown station
S4: Fairfield to Chester Hill shopping service

Villawood station is served by one NightRide route:
N50: Liverpool station to Town Hall station

References

External links

Villawood station details Transport for New South Wales

Railway stations in Sydney
Railway stations in Australia opened in 1924
City of Fairfield
Main Southern railway line, New South Wales